Solenosteira cancellaria is a species of sea snail, a marine gastropod mollusc in the family Pisaniidae.

Description

Distribution

References

External links
 Petit de la Saussaye, S. (1856). Description de coquilles nouvelles. Journal de Conchyliologie. 5: 87–92, pl. 2
  Rosenberg, G.; Moretzsohn, F.; García, E. F. (2009). Gastropoda (Mollusca) of the Gulf of Mexico, Pp. 579–699 in: Felder, D.L. and D.K. Camp (eds.), Gulf of Mexico–Origins, Waters, and Biota. Texas A&M Press, College Station, Texas

Pisaniidae
Gastropods described in 1846